Alma   is an unincorporated rural community in the Canadian province of Nova Scotia, located in  Pictou County. It is named after the Battle of Alma which occurred in 1854 during the Crimean War.

It is on Nova Scotia Trunk 4 which was formerly part of the Trans-Canada Highway until being bypassed by Nova Scotia Highway 104 in the late 1990s.

References

Links
Alma, Destination-ns.com. Accessed December 22, 2022.

Communities in Pictou County